William David Kenny VC (1 February 1899 – 2 January 1920) was a British Indian Army officer and an Irish recipient of the Victoria Cross, the highest award for gallantry in the face of the enemy that can be awarded to British and Commonwealth forces.

Early life
Kenny was born in Saintfield, County Down on 1 February 1899.

Military career
Kenny was commissioned in to the Indian Army as a second lieutenant on 31 August 1918. He was promoted to lieutenant a year later.

He was 20 years old, and a lieutenant in the 4/39th Garhwal Rifles during the Waziristan Campaign when the deed took place for which he was awarded the VC. The citation was published in a supplement to the London Gazette of 7 September 1920 (dated 9 September 1920):

The medal
His Victoria Cross is displayed at the National Army Museum in Chelsea.

Memorials: India Gate, Delhi, India, Donaghadee, Co Down, Northern Ireland, Dundalk Grammar School, Dundalk, Co. Louth, Republic of Ireland.

References

Bibliography
The Register of the Victoria Cross (1981, 1988 and 1997)

Ireland's VCs  (Dept of Economic Development, 1995)
Monuments to Courage (David Harvey, 1999)
Irish Winners of the Victoria Cross (Richard Doherty & David Truesdale, 2000)

External links
VC medal auction details

1899 births
1920 deaths
People from Saintfield
Irish recipients of the Victoria Cross
British Indian Army officers
British military personnel of the Waziristan Campaign
19th-century Irish people
Irish soldiers in the British Indian Army
British Indian Army personnel killed in action
Military personnel from County Down
Indian Army personnel of World War I